Laura Thompson is a Canadian musician and an arts & entertainment reporter and producer for CBC News. She appears on CBC News Network, CBC Radio and CBC-TV's The National. She was the music columnist for CBC Newsworld's former daily arts wrap, The Scene.

Thompson has interviewed celebrities such as Channing Tatum, Rachel McAdams, Amy Adams, Shakira, will.i.am, Taylor Swift and John Cusack.

Thompson is a graduate of the University of Guelph with a degree in studio art. She completed her post-graduate studies in journalism at Sheridan College. In 2011, Thompson returned to Sheridan as the keynote speaker for its graduating class and was inducted into its "Wall of Fame."

Thompson has been a juror for the Polaris Music Prize since 2007, twice presenting at the awards gala.

She is also a member of Toronto-based pop band The Good Soldiers.

References

External links
 The Good Soldiers on MySpace

Canadian television journalists
Living people
1979 births
Canadian women television journalists
University of Guelph alumni
Sheridan College alumni
Canadian Broadcasting Corporation people
Journalists from Ontario
People from Kitchener, Ontario